The 2023 Stanford Cardinal baseball team represents Stanford University in the 2023 NCAA Division I baseball season. The Cardinal will play their home games at Klein Field at Sunken Diamond under sixth year coach David Esquer.

Previous season
The Cardinal finished the regular season in first place and won the Pac-12 Tournament. Stanford hosted their own Regional and won their Super Regional over UConn in three games. Stanford reached the College World Series for the first time in back-to-back seasons since 2002–2003. The Cardinal lost in their double elimination games against Arkansas and Auburn.

2022 MLB Draft
The Cardinal had nine players drafted in the 2022 MLB draft.

 Quin Mathews did not sign with the Tampa Bay Rays and has returned to Stanford.
 Matt Scott did not sign out of high school with the Texas Rangers and will play college baseball at Stanford

Departures

Incoming Recruits

Personnel

Roster

Coaching staff

Pac–12 media poll

Preseason Honors

All-Pac-12 Team

Preseason All-Americans

Award watch lists

Schedule and results

! colspan=2 style="" | Regular Season
|- valign="top"

|- align="center" bgcolor="ffdddd"
|Feb. 17 || at * || No. 3 || Goodwin Field • Fullerton, CA ||  L 1–8 || Stultz (1–0) || Mathews (0–1) || Chester (1) || ESPN+ || 1,732 || 0–1 ||
|- align="center" bgcolor="ddffdd"
|Feb. 18 || at Cal State Fullerton* || No. 3 || Goodwin Field • Fullerton, CA ||  W 7–5 || Scott (1–0) || Meyer (0–1) || Bruno (1) || ESPN+ || 1,406 || 1–1 ||
|- align="center" bgcolor="ddffdd"
|Feb. 19 || at Cal State Fullerton* || No. 3 || Goodwin Field • Fullerton, CA ||  W 21–13 || Montgomery (1–0) || Faulks (0–1) ||  || ESPN+ || 1,771 || 2–1 ||
|- align="center" bgcolor="ffdddd"
|Feb. 21 || * || No. 2 || Klein Field at Sunken Diamond • Stanford, CA ||  L 4–8 || Williams (1–0) || O'Harran (0–1) ||  || P12N || 1,337 || 2–2 ||
|- align="center" bgcolor="ddffdd"
|Feb. 24 || * || No. 2 || Klein Field at Sunken Diamond • Stanford, CA ||  W 6–3 || Mathews (1–1) || Smith (0–1) || Scott (1) || P12N || 1,159 || 3–2 ||
|- align="center" bgcolor="ddffdd"
|Feb. 25 || Rice* || No. 2 || Klein Field at Sunken Diamond • Stanford, CA ||  W 11–1 || Dixon (1–0) || Rodriguez (0–1) ||  || Stanford Live Stream-2 || 1,422 || 4–2 ||
|- align="center" bgcolor="ddffdd"
|Feb. 26 || Rice* || No. 2 || Klein Field at Sunken Diamond • Stanford, CA ||  W 7–4 || Scott (2–0) || Brogdon (0–1) ||  || Stanford Live Stream-2 || 1,422 || 5–2 ||
|- align="center" bgcolor="ddffdd"
|Feb. 27 || * || No. 2 || Klein Field at Sunken Diamond • Stanford, CA ||  W 15–5 || Lopez (1–0) || Defe (0–1) ||  || Stanford Live Stream || 212 || 6–2 ||
|-

|- align="center" bgcolor="ddffdd"
|Mar. 3 || * || No. 2 || Klein Field at Sunken Diamond • Stanford, CA ||  W 7–1 || Mathews (2–1) || Verdugo (2–1) ||  || Stanford Live Stream-2 || 982 || 7–2 ||
|- align="center" bgcolor="ddffdd"
|Mar. 4 || Cal State Bakersfield* || No. 2 || Klein Field at Sunken Diamond • Stanford, CA ||  W 8–4 || Dixon (2–0) || Scheurman (1–1) ||  || Stanford Live Stream-2 || 1,143 || 8–2 ||
|- align="center" bgcolor="ddffdd"
|Mar. 5 || Cal State Bakersfield* || No. 2 || Klein Field at Sunken Diamond • Stanford, CA ||  W 24–9 || Lopez (2–0) || Comnos (2–1) ||  || Stanford Live Stream-3 || 1,196 || 9–2 ||
|- align="center" bgcolor="ffdddd"
|Mar. 7 || * || No. 2 || Klein Field at Sunken Diamond • Stanford, CA ||  L 5–10 || Feikes (1–0) || Moore (0–1) ||  || Stanford Live Stream || 974 || 9–3 ||
|- align="center" bgcolor="ddffdd"
|Mar. 10 || at  || No. 2 || Dedeaux Field • Los Angeles, CA ||  W 6–4 || Mathews (3–1) || Connolly (0–1) || Dowd (1) || USC Live Stream || 523 || 10–3 || 1–0
|- align="center" bgcolor="ffdddd"
|Mar. 11 || at USC || No. 2 || Dedeaux Field • Los Angeles, CA ||  L 7–10 || Blum (2–0) || Lopez (2–1) || Clarke (1) || USC Live Stream || 431 || 10–4 || 1–1
|- align="center" bgcolor="ffdddd"
|Mar. 12 || at USC || No. 2 || Dedeaux Field • Los Angeles, CA ||  L 1–4 || Johnson (1–2) || Dowd (0–1) || Clarke (2) || USC Live Stream || 708 || 10–5 || 1–2
|- align="center" bgcolor=
|Mar. 17 || Oregon State ||  || Klein Field at Sunken Diamond • Stanford, CA ||    –||  (–) ||  (–) ||  || P12N ||  || – ||
|- align="center" bgcolor=
|Mar. 18 || Oregon State ||  || Klein Field at Sunken Diamond • Stanford, CA ||    –||  (–) ||  (–) ||  || P12 Bay Area ||  || – ||
|- align="center" bgcolor=
|Mar. 19 || Oregon State ||  || Klein Field at Sunken Diamond • Stanford, CA ||    –||  (–) ||  (–) ||  || P12 Oregon ||  || – ||
|- align="center" bgcolor=
|Mar. 25 ||  ||  || Klein Field at Sunken Diamond • Stanford, CA ||    –||  (–) ||  (–) ||  || Stanford Live Stream ||  || – ||
|- align="center" bgcolor=
|Mar. 26 || Utah ||  || Klein Field at Sunken Diamond • Stanford, CA ||    –||  (–) ||  (–) ||  || Stanford Live Stream ||  || – ||
|- align="center" bgcolor=
|Mar. 27 || Utah ||  || Klein Field at Sunken Diamond • Stanford, CA ||    –||  (–) ||  (–) ||  || Stanford Live Stream ||  || – ||
|- align="center" bgcolor=
|Mar. 30 || at * ||  || L. Dale Mitchell Baseball Park • Norman, OK ||    –||  (–) ||  (–) ||  ||  ||  || – ||
|- align="center" bgcolor=
|Mar. 31 || at Oklahoma* ||  || L. Dale Mitchell Baseball Park • Norman, OK ||    –||  (–) ||  (–) ||  ||  ||  || – ||
|-

|- align="center" bgcolor=
|Apr. 1 || at Oklahoma* ||  || L. Dale Mitchell Baseball Park • Norman, OK ||    –||  (–) ||  (–) ||  ||  ||  || – ||
|- align="center" bgcolor=
|Apr. 2 || at Oklahoma* ||  || L. Dale Mitchell Baseball Park • Norman, OK ||    –||  (–) ||  (–) ||  ||  ||  || – ||
|- align="center" bgcolor=
|Apr. 6 || at California ||  || Evans Diamond • Berkeley, CA ||    –||  (–) ||  (–) ||  || P12 Bay Area ||  || – ||
|- align="center" bgcolor=
|Apr. 7 || at California ||  || Evans Diamond • Berkeley, CA ||    –||  (–) ||  (–) ||  || P12 Bay Area ||  || – ||
|- align="center" bgcolor=
|Apr. 8 || at California ||  || Evans Diamond • Bekreley, CA ||    –||  (–) ||  (–) ||  || P12N ||  || – ||
|- align="center" bgcolor=
|Apr. 10 || Texas Tech* ||  || Klein Field at Sunken Diamond • Stanford, CA ||    –||  (–) ||  (–) ||  || P12N ||  || – ||
|- align="center" bgcolor=
|Apr. 11 || Texas Tech* ||  || Klein Field at Sunken Diamond • Stanford, CA ||    –||  (–) ||  (–) ||  || P12 Insider ||  || – ||
|- align="center" bgcolor=
|Apr. 14 || at  ||  || PK Park • Eugene, OR ||    –||  (–) ||  (–) ||  || Oregon Live Stream ||  || – ||
|- align="center" bgcolor=
|Apr. 15 || at Oregon ||  || PK Park • Eugene, OR ||    –||  (–) ||  (–) ||  || Oregon Live Stream ||  || – ||
|- align="center" bgcolor=
|Apr. 16 || at Oregon ||  || PK Park • Eugene, OR ||    –||  (–) ||  (–) ||  || Oregon Live Stream ||  || – ||
|- align="center" bgcolor=
|Apr. 18 || * ||  || Klein Field at Sunken Diamond • Stanford, CA ||    –||  (–) ||  (–) ||  || Stanford Live Stream ||  || – ||
|- align="center" bgcolor=
|Apr. 21 ||  ||  || Klein Field at Sunken Diamond • Stanford, CA ||    –||  (–) ||  (–) ||  || Stanford Live Stream ||  || – ||
|- align="center" bgcolor=
|Apr. 22 || Washington ||  || Klein Field at Sunken Diamond • Stanford, CA ||    –||  (–) ||  (–) ||  || Stanford Live Stream ||  || – ||
|- align="center" bgcolor=
|Apr. 23 || Washington ||  || Klein Field at Sunken Diamond • Stanford, CA ||    –||  (–) ||  (–) ||  || Stanford Live Stream-2 ||  || – ||
|- align="center" bgcolor=
|Apr. 25 || California* ||  || Klein Field at Sunken Diamond • Stanford, CA ||    –||  (–) ||  (–) ||  || Stanford Live Stream ||  || – ||
|- align="center" bgcolor=
|Apr. 28 || UCLA ||  || Klein Field at Sunken Diamond • Stanford, CA ||    –||  (–) ||  (–) ||  || ESPNU ||  || – ||
|- align="center" bgcolor=
|Apr. 29 || UCLA ||  || Klein Field at Sunken Diamond • Stanford, CA ||    –||  (–) ||  (–) ||  || Stanford Live Stream ||  || – ||
|- align="center" bgcolor=
|Apr. 30 || UCLA ||  || Klein Field at Sunken Diamond • Stanford, CA ||    –||  (–) ||  (–) ||  || Stanford Live Stream ||  || – ||

|- align="center" bgcolor=
|May 5 || at  ||  || Phoenix Municipal Stadium • Tempe, AZ ||    –||  (–) ||  (–) ||  || P12 Insider ||  || – ||
|- align="center" bgcolor=
|May 6 || at Arizona State ||  || Phoenix Municipal Stadium • Tempe, AZ ||    –||  (–) ||  (–) ||  || P12 Insider ||  || – ||
|- align="center" bgcolor=
|May 7 || at Arizona State ||  || Phoenix Municipal Stadium • Tempe, AZ ||    –||  (–) ||  (–) ||  || P12 Insider ||  || – ||
|- align="center" bgcolor=
|May 9 || at Santa Clara ||  || Stephen Schott Stadium • Santa Clara, CA ||    –||  (–) ||  (–) ||  ||  ||  || – ||
|- align="center" bgcolor=
|May 12 || Arizona ||  || Klein Field at Sunken Diamond • Stanford, CA ||    –||  (–) ||  (–) ||  || P12N ||  || – ||
|- align="center" bgcolor=
|May 13 || Arizona ||  || Klein Field at Sunken Diamond • Stanford, CA ||    –||  (–) ||  (–) ||  || P12N ||  || – ||
|- align="center" bgcolor=
|May 14 || Arizona ||  || Klein Field at Sunken Diamond • Stanford, CA ||    –||  (–) ||  (–) ||  || P12N ||  || – ||
|- align="center" bgcolor=
|May 18 || at  ||  || Bailey–Brayton Field • Pullman, WA ||    –||  (–) ||  (–) ||  || P12 Washington ||  || – ||
|- align="center" bgcolor=
|May 19 || at Washington State ||  || Bailey–Brayton Field • Pullman, WA ||    –||  (–) ||  (–) ||  || P12 Bay Area ||  || – ||
|- align="center" bgcolor=
|May 20 || at Washington State ||  || Bailey–Brayton Field • Pullman, WA ||    –||  (–) ||  (–) ||  || P12 Bay Area ||  || – ||

! style="" | Postseason
|- valign="top"

|- align="center" bgcolor=
|May 23 ||  || || Scottsdale Stadium • Scottsdale, AZ ||   – || (–) || (–) ||  ||  || || – || –

Source:
Rankings are based on the team's current ranking in the D1Baseball poll. Parentheses indicate tournament seedings.

Rankings

References

Stanford
Stanford Cardinal baseball seasons
Stanford Cardinal